Ripon High School may refer to:
 Ripon High School (California), Ripon, San Joaquin County, California
 Ripon High School (Wisconsin), Ripon, Wisconsin